Emmanuelle Bouaziz (born 22 May) is a French actress, dancer and singer.

Life and career 
A father with Algerian jewish roots and a mother of Ukrainian origin,  
Emmanuelle Bouaziz studied dance at the Rick Odums Performing Arts Institute where she graduated as a dance teacher, and acting at cours Peyran-Lacroix in Paris and The Actor Centre in London.

She has appeared in the musicals Roméo et Juliette, Fame, Mamma Mia!, 1789: Les Amants de la Bastille.

She also acts in films and TV series.

Filmography

Film 
 2008 : Agathe Cléry by Etienne Chatiliez
 2014 : Sous les jupes des filles by Audrey Dana
 2014 : Allies by Dominic Burns
 2018 : Deux Moi by Cédric Klapish

Short 
 2005 :  Une majorette peut en cacher une autre by Lola Doillon
 2013 : Two lines by Illoyd Campos et Nicolas Van Beveren

Television 

 2007 :  de filles by Albin Voulfow
 2008 : Pas de secrets entre nous by Pierre Leix-Côte
 2008 : Les Bougon, series   
 2009 : Julie Lescaut, series
 2009-2011 : Chante !, series
 2010 : Mes amis, mes amours, mes emmerdes..., series
 2011 : La nouvelle Blanche-Neige by Laurent Bénégui
 2014 : Commissaire Magellan, series
 2015 : Catastrophe, series by Ben Taylor
 2016: EastEnders
 2017: The White Princess, miniseries
 2020-2021 : Clem (saisons 10-11), series

Clip 
 1998 : Machistador by Matthieu Chedid
 2002 : Mon amant de Saint-Jean by Patrick Bruel
 2009 : Super héros by Oz
 2014 :  Maman m'avait dit by Dumè

Musicals 
 2004 : Paradis d'amour - Paradis Latin
 2005 : Beauty and the Beast by Alan Menken, Howard Ashman and Tim Rice - Disneyland Park (Paris)
 2006 : Hôtel des cancans by Patrice Vrain Perrot - Paris
 2007 : High school musical on tour by Katy Harris and Christophe Boschard - Disneyland Park
 2007 : Roméo et Juliette by Gérard Presgurvic, dir Redha - Asia 
 2007-2008 : Big manoir by David Rozen - Paris
 2008 : Kid manoir by David Rozen - Paris
 2008 : The Tales of Hoffmann by Jacques Offenbach - Tour
 2008 : Lady blue by Jonathan Kerr - Paris
 2007-2009 : Aime et la Planète des Signes by Jean Louis Grinda - Paris
 2009 : La Vie parisienne by Jacques Offenbach - Massy
 2009 : Fame by José Fernandez, Jacques Levy, Steve Margoshes, dir Ned Grujic - Theatrical National Tour
 2010 : Generation Moonwalk, tribute to Michael Jackson by Aurore Stauder - Zénith de Paris
 2009-2010 : Les nouvelles aventures de Robin des Bois by Fred Colas - Théâtre Le Temple
 2010-2011 : Mamma Mia! by Benny Andersson and Björn Ulvaeus, Phyllida Lloyd - Théâtre Mogador
 2011 : Le fabuleux rêve d'Amélie by Aude Henneville - L'Olympia 
 2012-2013 : 1789 : Les Amants de la Bastille by Dove Attia and François Chouquet - Palais des Sports de Paris, tour
 2014-2015 : La folle histoire du Petit Chaperon Rouge by  Pascal Joseph and Nicolas Giraud - Paris
 2015 : Flashdance dir Philippe Hersen - Théâtre du Gymnase
 2017-2019: Émilie Jolie by Philippe Chatel - Theatrical National Tour

Choreographer 
 2009 : Les nouvelles aventures de Robin des Bois by Fred Colas - Théâtre Le Temple
 2017-2019 : Émilie Jolie by Philippe Chatel - Theatrical National Tour & L'Olympia

Theatre 
 2009-2010 : La bombe by Carole Greep -  Théâtre Le Temple, Paris, tour
 2010-2011 : V.O.S. by Carol Lopez- Theatre Pixel, Paris
 2017-2018 : L'Adieu à la Scène by Jacques Forgeas - dir Sophie Gubri Festival d'Avignon, Paris

References

External links 
  Biographie
 

Living people
French women singers
French female dancers
French film actresses
French television actresses
French musical theatre actresses
Year of birth missing (living people)
French people of Algerian-Jewish descent